Gårdinger is a Swedish surname. Notable people with the surname include:

 Malte Gårdinger (born 2000), Swedish actor
 Pontus Gårdinger (born 1964), Swedish television host

Swedish-language surnames